

Pre-Columbian era, to 1500

 30,000–11,000 B.C. – First native peoples enter North America from Asia via Beringia.
 11,000 B.C. – Disappearance of the land bridge between North America and Asia.
 5000 B.C. – Beginning of agriculture in the Tehuacán Valley matorral.
 1500 B.C. – Emergence of Eastern Woodland culture.
 1200 B.C. – Emergence of the Olmec culture.
 500 B.C. – Emergence of Maya civilization and Adena culture.
 300 B.C. – Maize first grown in Eastern North America.
 100 B.C. – A.D. 400 – The Hopewell tradition flourishes.
 600 – Emergence of Mississippian culture.
 700 – Use of the bow and arrow becomes widespread among peoples of Eastern North America.
 1200 – Population of Cahokia reaches roughly 30,000.
 1500  – Disappearance of Mississippian culture.

Age of Discovery, 1420–1550

 1492 – Christopher Columbus' first voyage.
 1494 – The Treaty of Tordesillas divides the New World between the Kingdom of Spain and the Kingdom of Portugal.
 1496 – Santo Domingo, the oldest continuously inhabited European settlement in the Americas, is settled.
 1497 – First voyage of John Cabot, searching for the Northwest Passage.
 1498 – Vasco da Gama reaches India.
 ca. 1500 – First African slaves taken to Hispaniola.
 1513  –  Ponce de León in Florida.
 1519 – Hernán Cortés conquers the Aztec Empire.
 1531–33 – Francisco Pizarro conquers the Inca Empire.
 1539–42 – Hernando de Soto explores North America from the Gulf of Mexico to the Ozarks.

Reign of Elizabeth I of England, 1558–1603
 1559 - Tristan de Luna founded the first short-lived settlement Pensacola, Florida.
 1565 – Pedro Menéndez de Avilés founds St. Augustine, Florida.
 1579 – Francis Drake claims New Albion for England.
 1585 – The Roanoke Colony is founded.
 1588 – England and its Dutch allies defeat the Spanish Armada.

Reign of James I of England, 1603–25

 1605 – George Weymouth explores New England.
 1606 – The London Company and the Plymouth Company are granted charters.
 1607 – Founding of the Jamestown Settlement.  Attempted colony at Sagadahoc fails.
 1608  – Founding of Quebec City by Samuel de Champlain.
 1609–10 – The Starving Time at Jamestown.
 1609 – Henry Hudson explores the Hudson River.
 1611–16  – Thomas Dale and Thomas Gates serve as Governor of Virginia.
 1614 – Peace between the Virginia colony and the Powhatan Confederacy.
 1619 – First meeting of the Virginia House of Burgesses.  First Africans in Virginia.
 1620 – The Pilgrims found the Plymouth Colony.
 1622 – Indian massacre of 1622 in Virginia.
 1624 – Virginia Company collapses and Virginia becomes a crown colony.  Dutch West India Company founds New Netherland.
 1624–26 – Dorchester Company founded.
 1624–28 – Mohawks defeat the Mahicans.

Reign of Charles I of England, 1625–49

 1625 – Accession of Charles I of England.
 1626 – Founding of Salem, Massachusetts (originally called "Naumkeag").  Peter Minuit purchases Manhattan.
 1627 – George Calvert, 1st Baron Baltimore decides to abandon the Province of Avalon.
 1628 – Dorchester Company reorganized as the New England Company.
 1629 – New England Company reorganized as the Massachusetts Bay Company.  Kiliaen van Rensselaer institutes the patroon system.
 1630 – Puritans found Boston and ten other settlements in the Massachusetts Bay Colony.  John Winthrop preaches his City upon a Hill sermon.  First meeting of the Massachusetts General Court.
 1632 – Tax protest at Watertown.  George Calvert, 1st Baron Baltimore obtains charter to found the Province of Maryland.
 1634 – Creation of the shires of Virginia.  Council members insist on viewing the Massachusetts charter.  First English settlers arrive in Maryland.
 1634–36 – First English settlements in the Connecticut River Valley.
 1635 – Roger Williams expelled from the Massachusetts Bay Colony.  First meeting of the Maryland General Assembly. Saybrook Colony founded.
 1636 – Connecticut Colony founded. Roger Williams founds the Colony of Rhode Island and Providence Plantations.  Harvard University founded. 
 1637 – The Pequot War results in the killing of many of the Pequot people.  New Haven Colony is founded.  Anne Hutchinson expelled from the Massachusetts Bay Colony.
 1638 – Founding of New Sweden.  First mention of slavery in the laws of the Province of Maryland.
 1639 – Crown formally recognizes the Virginia Assembly.
 1641 – First meeting of representatives in New Netherland.
 1642 – Beginning of the English Civil War.
 1643 – The New England Confederation is founded.
 1643–45 – War between the Native Americans and the Dutch settlers.
 1644 – Parliament grants charter to the Colony of Rhode Island and Providence Plantations.  Saybrook Colony incorporated into the Connecticut Colony.
 1644–46 – Second Native American Massacre.  The Plundering Time in Maryland.
 1646 – Peter Stuyvesant becomes Director-General of New Netherland.
 1648 – The Cambridge Platform.
 1649 – Regicide of Charles I.  Death of John Winthrop.

English Interregnum, 1649–60

 1651 – In the wake of the English Civil War, Virginia acknowledges the authority of the Parliament of England.
 1652 – Massachusetts Bay Colony authorizes John Hull and Robert Sanderson to issue colonial coinage.       
 1655 – Dutch take control of New Sweden.  The Peach Tree War between Dutch settlers and the Susquehannock and allied tribes.  Maryland fights the Battle of the Severn.
 1656 – First Quakers arrive in New England.
 1657 – Jews allowed to become burghers of New Amsterdam. Flushing Remonstrance lays groundwork for religious freedom in America.
 1658 – Death of Oliver Cromwell

Reign of Charles II of England, 1660–85

 1660 – The Restoration of the monarchy in England, with Charles II becoming king.  William Berkeley restored as governor of Virginia.  First of the Navigation Acts enumerates exports from the colonies.  Execution of Mary Dyer.
 1662 – Crown confirms the charters of Rhode Island and Connecticut.  New Haven Colony incorporated into the Connecticut Colony.  Half-Way Covenant in New England.  In the Colony of Virginia, the House of Burgesses passes a law declaring that, with respect to slavery, children take the status of their mother.
 1663 – Second Navigation Act regulates exports to the colonies.  Crown grants proprietary charter creating the Province of Carolina.
 1664 – Royal commission investigates conditions in New England.  As part of the Second Anglo-Dutch War, England captures New Netherland and renames it the Province of New York.
 1665 – The Duke's Laws are issued.
 1666 – Great Fire of London.
 1669 – The Fundamental Constitutions of Carolina are drawn up.
 1670 – Charleston, South Carolina is founded, originally as Charles Town.
 1672–74 – Third Anglo-Dutch War.
 1673 – Third Navigation Act regulates intercolonial trade. Virginia land rights given to Thomas Colepeper, 2nd Baron Colepeper  and Henry Bennet, 1st Earl of Arlington.
 1674 – East Jersey and West Jersey chartered.
 1675 – Outbreak of King Philip's War; Northfield, Massachusetts abandoned.
 1676 – Bacon's Rebellion quashed.  Metacomet defeated.  William Penn and the Quakers purchase West Jersey.
 1677 – Colonists in North Carolina rebel against Thomas Colepeper, 2nd Baron Colepeper.  Edmund Andros, Governor of New York, negotiates the Covenant Chain with the Iroquois.
 1679–81 – Debate over the Exclusion Bill in England.
 1680 – Destruction of the Westo people in South Carolina.  Charleston, South Carolina relocated to its current location.  Province of New Hampshire becomes a royal colony.
 1681 – William Penn granted charter to establish Province of Pennsylvania.  Edward Randolph appointed customs collector for New England.  City of London loses its charter.
 1682 – Philadelphia founded.  Plant cutter riots in Gloucester County, Virginia.
 1683 – "Hull Mint" closed. John Hull dies. 
 1683 – Province of New York holds first assembly and issues the Charter of Liberties.  Institution of quo warranto proceedings against the Province of Massachusetts.

Reign of James II of England, 1685–89

 1685 – Articles of misdemeanor drawn up against provinces of Rhode Island and Connecticut. Creation of the Dominion of New England.
 1686 – Edmund Andros becomes Governor General of the Dominion of New England. First German Pietists arrive in Pennsylvania.
 1687 – New England protests against arbitrary taxes. Reverend John Wise jailed. 
 1688 – Province of New York added to the Dominion of New England.  Glorious Revolution.

Reign of William III and Mary II of England, 1689–1694

 1689 – April: Dominion of New England overthrown in Boston.  June:  Leisler's Rebellion.  July: Proprietary government overthrown in Maryland.  War breaks out with Kingdom of France, beginning the Nine Years' War in Europe; beginning of King William's War in the colonies.  George Keith controversy divides Pennsylvania Quakers.
 1690 – Schenectady, New York devastated by French and Native American troops.  Massachusetts Bay Colony becomes first colony to issue paper money. Spain begins to colonise Texas.
 1691 – The Province of Carolina passes a law for the better ordering of slaves.
 1692 – First of the Salem witch trials.
 1693 – Rice culture introduced in the Province of Carolina.

Reign of William III of England (as sole monarch), 1694-1702

 1696 – Board of Trade established.
 1697 – Treaty of Ryswick signed, ending King William's War.
 1699 – Parliament bans export of colonial woolens.  Free blacks ordered to leave the Colony of Virginia.
 1700 – Neutrality treaty between the Iroquois and New France.  William Kidd arrested in Boston.
 1701 – William Penn issues his last frame of government.  Delaware Colony granted charter, separating it from Pennsylvania.  Yale University founded.
 1702 – East Jersey and West Jersey merge, becoming the Province of New Jersey.  Beginning of the War of the Spanish Succession in Europe / Queen Anne's War in the colonies.  Province of Carolina attacks St. Augustine.

Reign of Anne, Queen of Great Britain, 1702–14

 1704 – Raid on Deerfield.  The Province of Carolina allows the arming of slaves during time of war.
 1705 – The House of Burgesses passes the Virginia Slave Codes of 1705.
 1707 – Benjamin Church fails to take Port Royal.
 1710 – Francis Nicholson takes Port Royal.
 1711 – The British fail to take Quebec City.
 1711–12 – North Carolina begins the Tuscarora War in fighting with the Tuscarora people.
 1712 – New York Slave Revolt of 1712.
 1713 – Treaty of Utrecht ends Queen Anne's War.

Reign of George I of Great Britain, 1714–27

1715 – South Carolina begins the Yamasee War against the Yamasee people.
1718 – Blackbeard killed by naval forces of the Colony of Virginia.
1719 – Rebellion against proprietary officials in South Carolina.
1720 – New France builds Fort Niagara.  Slaves become the majority of the population in South Carolina.
1723 – Colony of Virginia passes an act to deal with slave conspiracies.
1727 – British build Fort Oswego.

Reign of George II of Great Britain, 1727–60

1729 – Proprietary rights to South and North Carolina are surrendered.
ca. 1730 – For the first time, the majority of slaves in Chesapeake, Virginia were born in the New World.
1732 – The Province of South Carolina attempts to ban the import of slaves.  The Province of Georgia is founded.
1735 – The Province of Georgia bans slavery.
1739 – Outbreak of the War of Jenkins' Ear.  The Stono Rebellion in the Province of South Carolina is crushed.
1740 – The Plantation Act is passed to encourage immigration to the colonies and regularize colonial naturalization procedures. Battle of Cartagena de Indias, where the colonists are called "Americans" for the first time.  James Oglethorpe fails to take St. Augustine.  South Carolina enacts the Negro Act of 1740.
1741 – The New York Conspiracy of 1741 is suppressed.  Jonathan Edwards preaches "Sinners in the Hands of an Angry God", a key moment of the First Great Awakening.
1745 – New Englanders take Louisbourg.
1746 – Princeton University founded, with Jonathan Dickinson as its first president.
1747 – Founding of the Ohio Company.
1748 – Treaty of Aix-la-Chapelle, ending the War of the Austrian Succession.
1750 – Thomas Walker passes through the Cumberland Gap.  Reversing itself, the Province of Georgia decides to permit slavery.
1754 – Outbreak of French and Indian War.  French build Fort Duquesne.  Albany Congress, where plans of colonial union are unveiled. Columbia University founded as King's College by George II Royal Charter.
1755 – Braddock Expedition.
1755–58 – Expulsion of the Acadians.
1756 – Beginning of Seven Years' War in Europe.  Battle of Fort Oswego.
1757 – Siege of Fort William Henry.
1758 – Siege of Louisbourg; Battle of Fort Frontenac; Battle of Fort Duquesne.  The first black Baptist church is founded in Lunenburg, Virginia.
1759 – Battle of the Plains of Abraham.  St. Francis Raid.
1760 – Battle of the Thousand Islands, after which Jeffery Amherst receives the surrender of New France.

Reign of George III of Great Britain, 1760–83

1760 – October: George III becomes king.
1761 – February: Writs of Assistance challenged in Massachusetts.  December: Ban on colonial land grants.
1763 – February: Treaty of Paris ends the French and Indian War.  April: George Grenville becomes First Lord of the Treasury.  May: Beginning of Pontiac's War.  October: Royal Proclamation of 1763.  December: Conestoga Native Americans killed by the Paxton Boys.
1764 – April: The Parliament of Great Britain passes the Sugar Act and the Currency Act; Brown University founded as College in the English Colony of Rhode Island and Providence Plantations.
1765 – March: Stamp Act is passed.  May: Quartering Act is passed.  Virginia House of Burgesses passes the Virginia Resolves.  August: Riots in Boston.  October: Stamp Act Congress held in New York City.  November: The Stamp Act due to come into effect.
1766 – January: The New York Assembly refuses to implement the Quartering Act.  March: The Declaratory Act is passed, repealing the Stamp Act.
1767 – March: Boston makes first attempt at a nonimportation agreement.  June: Townshend Acts passed.  November: Publication of Letters from a Farmer in Pennsylvania begins.
1768 – February: Massachusetts sends circular letter to the other colonial assemblies.  March: Second nonimportation agreement is reached.  June: Bostonians riot when HMS Romney seizes the Liberty.  September: A convention of Massachusetts towns is held.
1769 – February: Parliament passes resolve calling for harsher treatment of the American colonists.  December:  Dartmouth College founded by King George III Royal Charter.
1770 – March: The Boston Massacre.  April: The Townshend duties are repealed on all goods except tea.
1772 – June: Gaspée Affair.  October: Committee of correspondence established in Boston.
1773 – March: Virginia Intercolonial committee of correspondence established.  December: The Boston Tea Party.
1774 – March: Boston Port Act passed.  May: Massachusetts Government Act passed.  September–October: First Continental Congress meets in Philadelphia.  
1775 – March–April: Parliament passes the Restraining Acts.  April: Battles of Lexington and Concord.  Second Continental Congress meets in Philadelphia.  August: Proclamation of Rebellion.  
1776 – January: Publication of Common Sense.  April: American ports opened to all nations.  May: Continental Congress authorizes the drafting of new state constitutions.  July 4: Adoption of the United States Declaration of Independence.
1776–81 – American Revolution.
1783 – September: Britain signs the Treaty of Paris, recognizing American independence. November 25: The British evacuate New York, marking the end of British rule, and General George Washington triumphantly returns with the Continental Army.

See also
Timeline of the American Revolution

References

Footnotes

Colonial America
Colonization history of the United States
History of the Thirteen Colonies